Aishwarya Rai Bachchan ( Rai; born 1 November 1973) is an Indian actress who is primarily known for her work in Hindi and Tamil films. The winner of the Miss World 1994 pageant, she has established herself as one of the most popular celebrities in India. Rai has received numerous accolades, including two Filmfare Awards, and was honoured with the Padma Shri by the Government of India in 2009 and the Ordre des Arts et des Lettres by the Government of France in 2012. She has often been cited in the media as "the most beautiful woman in the world".

While in college, Rai did a few modelling jobs. Following appearances in several television commercials, she entered the Miss India pageant, in which she placed second. She was then crowned Miss World 1994, after which she began receiving offers to act in film. She made her acting debut in Mani Ratnam's 1997 Tamil film Iruvar and had her first Hindi film release in Aur Pyaar Ho Gaya that same year. Her first commercial success was the Tamil romantic drama Jeans (1998), which was the most expensive Indian film at the time. She achieved wider success and won two Filmfare Awards for Best Actress for her performances in Sanjay Leela Bhansali's romantic dramas Hum Dil De Chuke Sanam (1999) and Devdas (2002).

Rai garnered critical appreciation for portraying a passionate artist in the Tamil romance film Kandukondain Kandukondain (2000), Tagore's heroine, Binodini, in the Bengali film Chokher Bali (2003), a depressed woman in the drama Raincoat (2004), Kiranjit Ahluwalia in the British drama film Provoked (2006), and a nurse in Bhansali's drama Guzaarish (2010). Rai's greatest commercial successes have been the romantic drama Mohabbatein (2000), the adventure film Dhoom 2 (2006), the drama Guru (2007), the period film Jodhaa Akbar (2008), the science fiction film Enthiran (2010), the romantic drama Ae Dil Hai Mushkil (2016), and the period film Ponniyin Selvan: I (2022).

Rai married actor Abhishek Bachchan in 2007; the couple have one daughter. Her off-screen roles include duties as a brand ambassador for several charity organisations and campaigns. She is a Goodwill Ambassador for the Joint United Nations Programme on AIDS (UNAIDS). In 2003, she was the first Indian actress to be a jury member at the Cannes Film Festival.

Early life 
Rai was born on 1 November 1973 into a Tulu-speaking Bunt family in Mangalore, Karnataka. Her father, Krishnaraj, who died on 18 March 2017, was an Army biologist, while her mother, Vrinda, is a housewife. She has one elder brother, Aditya Rai, who is an engineer in the merchant navy. Rai's movie Dil Ka Rishta (2003) was co-produced by her brother and co-written by her mother. The family moved to Mumbai, where Rai attended the Arya Vidya Mandir High School. Rai did her intermediate schooling at Jai Hind College for a year, and then joined DG Ruparel College in Matunga, securing 90 percent in the HSC exams.

She trained in classical dance and music for five years during her teens. Her favourite subject was zoology, and she initially considered a career in medicine. Then, with plans to become an architect, she enrolled at Rachana Sansad Academy of Architecture, but later gave up her education to pursue a career in modelling.

Career

Modelling work and acting breakthrough (1991–1999) 
In 1991, Rai won an international supermodel contest (organised by Ford) and was eventually featured in the American edition of Vogue. In 1993, Rai gained huge public recognition for her appearance in a Pepsi commercial with actors Aamir Khan and Mahima Chaudhry. The single line – "Hi, I'm Sanjana," of her dialogue in the commercial made her instantly famous. In the 1994 Miss India pageant, she won second place, behind Sushmita Sen, and was crowned Miss India World, also winning five other sub-titles, "Miss Catwalk", "Miss Miraculous", "Miss Photogenic", "Miss Perfect Ten" and "Miss Popular". With Sen representing India at the Miss Universe pageant, Rai's duties as the first runner-up included representing India in the rival Miss World Pageant, held that year in Sun City, South Africa. She went on to win the crown where she also won the "Miss Photogenic" award and Miss World Continental Queen of Beauty − Asia and Oceania. After winning the pageant, Rai spoke of her dream for peace for this world, and her desire to be an ambassador of peace during her one-year reign in London. Rai continued to pursue a career as a model until she became an actress.

Rai made her acting debut in 1997 with Mani Ratnam's Tamil film Iruvar, a semi-biographical political drama, featuring Mohanlal, Prakash Raj, Tabu and Revathi. The film was a critical success and among other awards, won the Best Film award at the Belgrade International Film Festival. Rai featured as Pushpavalli and Kalpana – dual roles; the latter was a fictionalised portrayal of politician and former actress Jayalalithaa. Her dialogue in the film was dubbed by Tamil actress Rohini. That same year, she was cast as Ashi, a naive teenager in her first Bollywood film – Aur Pyaar Ho Gaya, a romantic comedy opposite Bobby Deol. Both Iruvar and Aur Pyaar Ho Gaya were commercial failures and reviewers were critical of Rai's acting ability in both the films. However, for the latter, she won a Screen Award for Best Female Debut.

In the 1998 big-budget Tamil romantic drama Jeans directed by S. Shankar, Rai appeared alongside Prashanth. She played Madhumita, a young woman who accompanies her ailing grandmother to the United States to seek medical attention. A commercial success, the film earned Rai praise for her acting and dancing skills. In this film, her dialogue was dubbed by Savitha Reddy. Jeans was later submitted as India's official entry to the Academy Awards for 1998.

Rai's first role in 1999 was in the melodrama Aa Ab Laut Chalen, directed by Rishi Kapoor. The film was a critical failure and had a below average performance at the box office. Rai's portrayal of Pooja Walia, a traditional Indian woman living in the United States, met with negative reviews; Rediff.com published, "Rai sports a plastic smile and never gets a scene where she can portray any depth. All she does is cry and smile and look pretty". Also in 1999, she starred in the romantic musical Hum Dil De Chuke Sanam, which became a significant turning point in her career. The film, an adaptation of Maitreyi Devi's Bengali novel Na Hanyate, was directed by Sanjay Leela Bhansali and co-starred Salman Khan and Ajay Devgan. She played Nandini, a Gujarati woman who is forced into wedlock (with Devgan's character) despite being in love with another man (played by Khan). Bhansali cast Rai after he met her at the screening of a film and was impressed with her eyes. Khalid Mohamed of Bombay Talkies wrote that Rai "reveals an unquestionable felicity for acting" and has "that impossible combination of breathtaking beauty and brains". Hum Dil De Chuke Sanam emerged as a commercial success and won Rai a Filmfare Award for Best Actress.

Rai next took up the leading role of Mansi, an aspiring singer, in Subhash Ghai's musical romantic drama Taal; alongside Akshay Khanna and Anil Kapoor. A reviewer for Rediff praised her acting and dancing prowess in the film and wrote that "Taal will again enhance her reputation as an actress while in no way detracting from her image as a traffic-stopper". A domestic commercial success, Taal was notable for being the first Indian film to feature in the top 20 listing at the American box office. Rai received a second Best Actress nomination that year at the Filmfare Awards ceremony.

Established actress (2000–2008) 
In 2000, Rai starred in Kandukondain Kandukondain, a Tamil language adaptation of Jane Austen's novel Sense and Sensibility. Directed by Rajiv Menon, the film also starred Mammooty, Tabu and Ajith Kumar in prominent roles. Rai was cast as Meenakshi (based on the character of Marianne Dashwood), the younger sister of Tabu's character. The film was a critical and commercial success and earned Rai positive comments from critics; a review carried by The Indian Express summarized, "Attacking her role with just the perfect dollop of innocence, Rai does full justice to her part, and matches up perfectly to Tabu."

Rai next starred alongside Shah Rukh Khan and Chandrachur Singh in the action drama Josh. She portrayed Shirley Dias, the twin sister of Khan's character who falls in love with his arch enemy's brother (played by Singh). The casting of Rai as Khan's sister was considered an unusual pairing at the time; director Mansoor Khan, however, described it as "perfect". Despite earning mixed reviews from film critics, Josh emerged as a commercial success. Satish Kaushik's social drama Hamara Dil Aapke Paas Hai was Rai's next release; she played a rape victim in the film. Co-starring Anil Kapoor and Sonali Bendre, the film was well received by critics and did well at the box office. Film critic Sukanya Verma praised Rai's decision to star in the film and added that she "conveys the turmoil and pain of a rape victim well. But it is her transition from an emotional wreck trying to gather the broken pieces of her life back together that is amazing." Rai's performance in the film eventually earned a third Best Actress nomination at Filmfare.

Following a leading role in the box-office flop Dhai Akshar Prem Ke, Rai took on a supporting role in Aditya Chopra's musical romantic drama Mohabbatein. Rai played Megha Shankar, the daughter of Amitabh Bachchan's character who commits suicide after realizing that her father will not accept her romance with one of his students (played by Shah Rukh Khan). Receiving highly positive reviews from critics, Mohabbatein emerged as the highest-grossing film of the year and earned Rai a nomination for the Filmfare Award for Best Supporting Actress. The following year, she starred alongside Govinda and Jackie Shroff in the romantic comedy Albela. Upon release, both the film and her performance received mostly negative reviews; Taran Adarsh of Bollywood Hungama criticized the film and mentioned Rai as "plastic in some scenes".

After featuring in David Dhawan's slapstick comedy film Hum Kisise Kum Nahin, Rai appeared alongside Shah Rukh Khan and Madhuri Dixit in Sanjay Leela Bhansali's period romantic drama Devdas, an adaptation of Sharat Chandra Chattopadhyay's novel of the same name. She played the role of Paro (Parvati), the love interest of the protagonist (played by Khan). The film was screened at the 2002 Cannes Film Festival and was featured by Time in their listing of the "10 Best Films of the Millennium". Alan Morrison, writing for Empire, praised the performances of the three leads and wrote, "Rai proves she has the acting talent to back up her flawless looks". Devdas was chosen as India's official entry for the Academy Award for Best Foreign Language Film and received a nomination at the BAFTA Awards in the Best Foreign Language Film category. In India, the film won 10 Filmfare Awards, including a second Best Actress award for Rai. Also in 2002, she participated in the show From India With Love in the UK, along with Amitabh Bachchan, Aamir Khan, Shah Rukh Khan and Preity Zinta. It took place at two outdoor venues, Manchester's Old Trafford and London's Hyde Park, with over 100,000 spectators.

In 2003, Rai featured in two romantic dramas — her brother's production début Dil Ka Rishta, alongside Arjun Rampal, and Rohan Sippy's Kuch Naa Kaho, alongside Abhishek Bachchan. Neither of these films fared well critically or commercially. She was later noted for her starring role in Rituparno Ghosh's independent Bengali film Chokher Bali, an adaptation of Rabindranath Tagore's novel of the same name. She portrayed the character of Binodini, an emotionally manipulative widow, struggling with her sexual desires in early-20th century Bengal. The film was a major critical success and Rai earned positive notice for her performance; Derek Elley of Variety noted, "Rai dominates the film with her delicately sensual presence and physical grace". Commercially, the film was a sleeper hit.

After the success of Chokher Bali, Rai returned to mainstream Hindi film with Rajkumar Santoshi's Khakee (2004), an action thriller featuring Amitabh Bachchan, Akshay Kumar, Ajay Devgan and Tusshar Kapoor. The film tells the story of five constables embroiled in a mystery surrounding a terrorist attack; Rai's role was that of Mahalakshmi, a gun moll. While filming for Khakee, Rai was accidentally hit by a running car, which resulted in the fracture of her left foot. Upon release, the film was a moderate critical and commercial success. In her next release, the romantic comedy Kyun! Ho Gaya Na..., Rai played Diya Malhotra, a university student who develops a one-sided attraction toward her friend Arjun Khanna (played by Vivek Oberoi). The film received mixed-to-positive reviews from critics, but was commercially unsuccessful.

Rai garnered international recognition in 2004 for her starring role opposite Martin Henderson in Gurinder Chadha's British film Bride and Prejudice, a Bollywood-style adaptation of Jane Austen's novel Pride and Prejudice. International film critics expressed mixed views on Rai's performance as the Punjabi version of Elizabeth Bennet; a review carried by The New York Times mentioned her as "radiantly beautiful but inert", while Rolling Stone noted that "she is a world-class hottie with talent to match, as she proves in her first English-speaking role." With a worldwide gross of $24 million against a production budget of $7 million, Bride and Prejudice proved to be a commercial success. Rai next collaborated with director Rituparno Ghosh for the second time on the 2004 relationship drama Raincoat, an adaptation of O. Henry's The Gift of the Magi, which won the National Film Award for Best Feature Film in Hindi. Critics praised the film and also noted the lack of glamour in Rai's role, which earned her a Best Actress nomination at Filmfare. Derek Elley of Variety called the film a "chamber-sized gem" and mentioned Rai for "[s]hunning her usual immaculate makeup and duds, and looking more like a broken, malfunctioning doll." On the contrary, Gautaman Bhaskaran of The Hindu thought that Rai "looks quite plain [and] seems to have made an earnest effort to emote, using less of her body and limbs and more of her face, and eyes in particular."

Rai next co-starred alongside Sanjay Dutt and Zayed Khan in the 2005 adult drama Shabd, which tells the story of an author who convinces his wife to pursue an illicit relationship with a younger man in research for his next book. The film received predominantly negative reviews and proved to be a commercial failure. The Times of India concluded, "For the umpteenth time, Ms. Rai looks drop-dead gorgeous. And that's about it. She is like that picture postcard you get when what you were actually waiting for is a letter. It's very beautiful to look at, but is of no use because it says nothing." The same year, Rai took on the lead role of Tilo in Paul Mayeda Berges's romantic fantasy film The Mistress of Spices, an adaptation of the novel of the same name by Chitra Banerjee Divakaruni. The film received negative reviews from film critics and emerged as a commercial failure. Peter Bradshaw of The Guardian termed Rai's performance as "annoying" and wrote that she "wafts and simpers" through the entire film. Rai's only successful venture of 2005 was a special appearance in Shaad Ali's crime comedy Bunty Aur Babli, in which she featured in the widely popular item number "Kajra Re".

Rai had two film releases in 2006, J. P. Dutta's Umrao Jaan and Yash Raj Films' Dhoom 2. The former, an adaptation of Mirza Hadi Ruswa's Urdu novel Umrao Jaan Ada (1905), tells the story of a doomed courtesan from 19th-century Lucknow. Rai played the titular role, a character famously played by Rekha in the first film adaptation of the novel. Reviewers, while comparing the film to its previous adaptation, were critical of the film as well as of Rai's performance. BBC noted, "While only Rai could emulate the grace and poise of Rekha, she doesn't quite capture the intensity of Umrao's abiding melancholy", adding that "Rai's incandescent beauty and artistry [..] does indeed keep the audience watching, though not necessarily emotionally engaged." In the Sanjay Gadhvi-directed adventure film Dhoom 2, Rai portrayed Sunehri, a petty thief who helps the police catch an illusive criminal; the film had an ensemble cast including Hrithik Roshan, Abhishek Bachchan, Bipasha Basu, and Uday Chopra. Rediff.com commented, "[She] is all gloss and no depth. You seldom feel any tension in her behaviour and expressions. [..] Sunehri enters the film nearly 50 minutes after its opening in a disguise. In no time, she is wearing the flimsiest of clothes. Once she opens her mouth—and she does it two minutes after appearing in the film—she spoils the image." Nonetheless, her performance earned her a sixth Filmfare Award nomination in the Best Actress category.

In 2007, Rai played the wife of Abhishek Bachchan's character in Mani Ratnam's social drama Guru. A fictionalized biography of businessman Dhirubhai Ambani, Guru tells the rag to riches story of an uneducated man who builds a multinational corporation. The film met with international critical acclaim and emerged as a box-office success. Richard Corliss of Time labelled her character as an "ornament", but Raja Sen from Rediff described it as "arguably her finest performance, visible especially when she takes over the film's climax." Rai received her seventh Best Actress nomination at Filmfare for her performance in the film. Rai next starred alongside Naveen Andrews and Miranda Richardson in Jag Mundhra's independent British drama Provoked, as the real-life character of Kiranjit Ahluwalia, a non-resident Indian who murders her husband after suffering years of domestic abuse. Rai earned mostly positive comments for her performance. Critic Indu Mirani from DNA wrote, "Aishwarya Rai plays the battered wife in what is undoubtedly one of her best performances to date. Rai convincingly goes through the various stages of shock, bewilderment, remorse and finally vindication". Internationally well-received, the film emerged as a moderate commercial success in the United Kingdom. That same year, Rai starred alongside Ben Kingsley, Colin Firth and Thomas Sangster as the Indian warrior Mira in Doug Lefler's epic film The Last Legion.

After a series of films that under-performed either critically or commercially, Rai garnered both critical and box-office success with Ashutosh Gowariker's period romantic drama Jodhaa Akbar (2008). The film narrates a partly fictionalized account of a marriage of convenience between the Mughal emperor Jalaluddin Muhammad Akbar (played by Hrithik Roshan) and the Rajput princess Jodha Bai (played by Rai). Rajeev Masand noted, "Rai is wonderfully restrained and uses her eyes expertly to communicate so much, making this one of her finest outings on screen." She then co-starred with her husband, Abhishek Bachchan, and her father-in-law, Amitabh Bachchan, in Ram Gopal Verma's political drama Sarkar Raj, a sequel to the 2005 box-office hit Sarkar. Rai was cast as Anita Rajan, the CEO of an international power firm who proposes to set up a plant in rural Maharashtra. The film was a critical and commercial success, with praise directed to the performances of the three leads.

Career fluctuations and sabbatical (2009–2016) 
Rai's next role was in the 2009 Harald Zwart-directed spy comedy The Pink Panther 2. Starring alongside Steve Martin, Jean Reno and Emily Mortimer, Rai portrayed the role of Sonia Solandres, a seductive criminology expert. Like its predecessor, the sequel received negative reviews from critics, but did a moderate business of $34 million at the American box office. Roger Ebert wrote, "Rai is breathtaking in Bollywood films, where they devote a great deal of expertise to admiring beauty, but here she's underutilized and too much in the background"; USA Today mentioned her expressions as "wooden" and added, "She looks gorgeous, but her expression rarely changes". In 2010, Rai was cast by Mani Ratnam in his Tamil film, which is also a bilingual modern-day adaptation of the Indian epic Ramayana. Her role was that of Ragini (modeled on Sita, the heroine of Ramayana), a woman married to the superintendent of police, who is kidnapped by a bandit. The Tamil version (Raavanan) and the Hindi version (Raavan) of the film were shot simultaneously and Rai played the same role in both the film versions. She made a comeback to Tamil cinema after a gap of 10 years with Raavanan. The Tamil version Raavanan was a huge commercial success, whereas the Hindi version Raavan was a commercial failure. The films received polarized reviews from film critics, as did Rai's performance. Kaveree Bamzai of India Today wrote, "Rai's Sita is one of the best things in the film ... her performance is heartfelt—this is a performer who is at ease playing women, rather than girls." However, film critics Aniruddha Guha and Rajeev Masand criticized her character and noted, "She's left to scream and shriek and hiss." Commercially, Raavanan emerged as a success, while Raavan flopped. Rai's next role was opposite Rajinikanth in the science fiction Tamil film Enthiran (2010), directed by S. Shankar. She was cast as Sana, a college student and the girlfriend of Rajinikanth's character. At the time of release, Enthiran was the most expensive Indian film production and eventually emerged as one of the highest-grossing Indian films of all time. She then appeared as Mala, an impetuous brat, in Vipul Shah's Action Replayy; a science fiction comedy co-starring Akshay Kumar, Aditya Roy Kapoor and Neha Dhupia.

Rai's final film of 2010 was the drama Guzaarish; her third collaboration with director Sanjay Leela Bhansali and actor Hrithik Roshan. The film tells the story of Ethan Mascarenas, a former magician (played by Roshan) with quadriplegia, who after years of struggle, files an appeal for euthanasia. Rai's role was that of Sophia D'Souza, Mascarenas' nurse, who is abused by her alcoholic husband. Due to her and Bhansali's prior associations, Rai agreed to the project before reading its script. Despite flopping at the box office, Guzaarish met with positive critical reviews. The Telegraph described it to be "one of Rai's best performances" and The Times of India summarized, "Rai is a stunning picture of fire and grace, walking away with certain scenes by her sheer vitality." In 2011, Rai was cast as the protagonist of Madhur Bhandarkar's social drama Heroine; however, due to her pregnancy, Rai was replaced by actress Kareena Kapoor, the original choice for the role.

After a five-year sabbatical from film acting, Rai made a comeback with Sanjay Gupta's drama-thriller Jazbaa, co-starring Shabana Azmi and Irrfan Khan. A remake of the Korean thriller Seven Days (2007), the film saw Rai play the role of Anuradha Verma, a criminal lawyer who is forced to defend a rapist in exchange for her daughter's safety. Shubha Shetty-Saha of Mid-Day criticized the film's unnecessary and intrusive melodrama and thought that Rai "looks the part and even does a fairly decent job, barring certain emotional scenes where she clearly goes over the top". The film underperformed at the box office. In 2016, Rai starred in Omung Kumar's biographical drama Sarbjit. The film is based on the life of Indian farmer Sarabjit Singh, who was convicted of terrorism by a Pakistani court, and how his sister Dalbir Kaur fought relentlessly for his release. Rai played the role of the sister of Sarabjit Singh (played by Randeep Hooda). The film premiered at the 69th Cannes Film Festival, and received mixed reactions from critics. Few reviewers expressed that Rai was "miscast" as she neither looked nor sounded like a Sikh woman. Her Punjabi accent and her over-the-top performance in few scenes was largely criticized, though several critics took note of how much she stood out in the film's quieter scenes. Rajeev Masand summarized that "she's required to scream and shout and weep copiously to express her anguish; the shrillness does her no favors. In quieter moments – like one in which Dalbir can't bear to part with her stillborn baby – the actress shines." Nonetheless, her role earned her tenth Filmfare Award for Best Actress nomination.

Success with intermittent work (2016–present) 
Rai's final release of 2016 was Karan Johar's musical romantic drama Ae Dil Hai Mushkil, alongside Anushka Sharma and Ranbir Kapoor, in which she played the role of a poet named Saba. Rai received positive reviews for her performance, despite having limited screen time. Joe Leydon of Variety considered her to be the film's prime asset and wrote that she "seems to have wandered in from another movie, one where emotions are conveyed in subtler and more affecting fashion. When she takes her leave from Ae Dil Hai Mushkil, you may wish you could go with her." Two years later, Rai played the part of a singer who is kidnapped by a troubled father in the unremarkable comedy-drama Fanney Khan (2018). An adaptation of the Belgian film Everybody's Famous! (2000), the film co-starred Anil Kapoor and Rajkummar Rao. Uday Bhatia of Mint disliked the film and found Rai "too unruffled a screen presence to convincingly sell the kind of silliness this film requires".

In 2022, Rai reunited with Mani Ratnam for Ponniyin Selvan: I, a Tamil ensemble period film based on Kalki Krishnamurthy's epic novel of the same name. She played Nandini, a scheming Chola queen. Haricharan Pudipeddi of Hindustan Times found Rai's to be the best performance among the ensemble cast, while Sonil Dedhia of News 18 added that she is "wonderfully restrained and uses her eyes expertly to communicate so much". The film earned over  worldwide to emerge as one of the highest-grossing Tamil films of all time. Rai will reprise her role in the sequel Ponniyin Selvan: II.

Off-screen work 
In 1999 Rai participated in a world tour called the Magnificent Five, along with Aamir Khan, Rani Mukerji, Akshaye Khanna and Twinkle Khanna. In the same year, she was appointed as Longines Ambassador of Elegance. In 2001, Rai appeared in her first world tour, which was Craze 2001, a series of concerts that was performed across the US alongside Anil Kapoor, Aamir Khan, Preity Zinta and Gracy Singh. The show faced early cancellation due to the 11 September 2001 attacks, and the team prepared to return to India as soon as possible. However, the shows continued successfully in Canada. In 2003, she became the first Indian actress to be a jury member at the Cannes Film Festival. In the same year she became a global brand ambassador of L'Oréal, alongside Andie MacDowell, Eva Longoria and Penélope Cruz. Rai is the brand ambassador for The Eye Bank Association of India's nationwide campaign to promote eye donation in India. In 2005, she became a brand ambassador for Pulse Polio, a campaign established by the Government of India in 1994 to eradicate polio in India. In the same year, Rai was appointed spokesperson for the International Year of Microcredit, raising awareness of the main goals and priorities of the United Nations' poverty alleviation efforts.

In February 2005 Rai performed with other Bollywood stars at the HELP! Telethon Concert, an event to raise money for the victims of the 2004 tsunami earthquake. Along with other members of the Bachchan family, she laid the foundation of a special school for underprivileged girls in Daulatpur village in Uttar Pradesh in 2008. Construction is being funded by the Bachchan family and the school will be named after Rai. Between July to August 2008, Rai, her husband Abhishek Bachchan, her father-in-law Amitabh Bachchan, and actors Preity Zinta, Ritesh Deshmukh and Madhuri Dixit starred in the "Unforgettable World Tour" stage production. The first leg covered the US, Canada, Trinidad, and London, England. Rai is also involved in the functional and administrative operations of her father-in-law's company, originally known as ABCL, and rechristened as AB Corp. Ltd. That company, along with Wizcraft International Entertainment Pvt. Ltd., developed the Unforgettable production. She appeared along with various other Bollywood actors at the closing ceremony of the 2006 Commonwealth Games in Melbourne. The performance showcased Indian culture as a lead-up to India hosting the 2010 Commonwealth Games.

Rai is a UN Microcredit Spokesperson.
She supports PETA India. She pledged to donate her eyes to the Eye Bank Association of India and appeared in a public awareness film on eye donation. In November 2004, Rai created the Aishwarya Rai Foundation to help needy people in India.
In 2009 Rai was appointed as the first Goodwill Ambassador of Smile Train, an international charity that provides free Cleft lip and palate surgery to children in need. Her work with Smile Train will focus not only on India, but on 76 different developing countries around the world.
In September 2012, Rai had joined United Nations Secretary General Ban Ki-moon and renowned Hollywood actor Michael Douglas at a ceremony to commemorate the International Day of Peace in New York. Later that week, she was appointed as the new international Goodwill Ambassador for UNAIDS, the joint United Nations programme on AIDS and HIV. She will raise global awareness on protecting children from HIV infection and increasing access to antiretroviral treatment.

Personal life 
In 1999, Rai began dating Bollywood actor Salman Khan; their relationship was often reported in the media until the couple separated in 2002. Rai cited "abuse (verbal, physical and emotional), infidelity and indignity" on the part of Khan as reasons for ending the relationship. She then had a romantic relationship with actor Vivek Oberoi before they broke-up in 2005.

Though they both appeared in Dhai Akshar Prem Ke (in which her then longtime boyfriend, Salman Khan, had a brief cameo) and Kuch Naa Kaho, Abhishek Bachchan fell in love with Rai whilst filming Dhoom 2. Their engagement was announced on  2007 and later confirmed by his father, Amitabh Bachchan. The couple married on 20 April 2007 according to traditional Hindu rites of the Bunt community, to which she belongs. North Indian and Bengali ceremonies were also performed. The wedding took place in a private ceremony at the Bachchan residence, "Prateeksha", in Juhu, Mumbai. They have been described in the Indian media as a supercouple. Rai is very close to her family, and lived with them in Bandra, Mumbai, until her marriage.

Rai is Hindu and deeply religious. Her international presence shot up when Abhishek Bachchan accompanied her to the Cannes Film festival shortly after their marriage, and later to The Oprah Winfrey Show, appearing on 28 September 2009. They were described as being more famous as a couple than Brangelina.

Rai gave birth to a girl, on 16 November 2011. Rai is commonly referred to by fans and the media by the nicknames "Ash" and "Aish", but has stated that she dislikes being called as such. She has discouraged people from referring to her by names other than "Aishwarya" as she does not want to "spoil [her] good name".

On 12 July 2020, Rai and her daughter were reported to have tested positive for COVID-19. On 17 July, they were reported to have been hospitalized. Rai and her daughter recovered and were discharged from the hospital on 27 July 2020.

In the media

Impact and reception 

Rai Bachchan is one of the most popular Bollywood celebrities. Despite constant media speculation, she keeps her personal life well-guarded. Her physical appearance and performances have made her a style icon for young women. In 2011, India Today noted that there were over 17,000 websites dedicated to her. She was selected by Verve magazine in its list of the country's most powerful women. In 2001, Forbes named Rai among the top five Indian movie stars. In a reader poll conducted by UK's Hello! magazine, she was voted "the most attractive woman of 2003". In the same year, Rai appeared in Rolling Stone magazine's annual "Hot List". In 2004, she was chosen by Time as one of the world's most influential people, and appeared on the cover of its 2003 Asia edition.

Rai is the first Indian actress to be on the jury of the Cannes International Film Festival. In October 2004 a wax figure of Rai was put on display in London's Madame Tussaud's wax museum. She was the sixth Indian and the second Bollywood personality—after her father-in-law, Amitabh Bachchan—to get this honour. In 2007, the same figure was displayed at Madame Tussaud's Museum in Times Square in New York. As her most distinctive physical features, Rai's green-blue eyes, luscious lips, curves and feminine mannerisms have been cited by the media as her trademark.

The same year, a tulip in the Netherlands was named "Aishwarya Rai" after her. Also in 2005, Mattel released a limited edition of Barbie dolls of Rai in the United Kingdom. The British magazine Maxim ranked Rai first on their list of "Hottest Women of India".

Rai appeared on such shows as Late Show with David Letterman, and was the first Bollywood personality to appear on Oprah's "Women Across the Globe" segment. In 2005 Harpers and Queen's list of "Most Beautiful Women in The World" ranked her ninth. In May 2006, Rai was featured in People Magazine as one of the "World's Most Beautiful People". The UK magazine Eastern Eye ranked her third in the list of "Asia's Sexiest Women" in 2006, and she was ranked eighth in 2009. In 2008, American television channel E!: Entertainment listed Rai's eyes as the sexiest on their Sexiest Body Parts list. In 2009, she made appearances on Martha Stewart's show Martha and on The Tyra Banks Show. In the same year Forbes listed Rai at 387th out of 1,411 actors on their list of the most bankable stars in Hollywood. She is the highest-ranked Indian actor on the list.

In a poll conducted by the newspaper Daily News and Analysis in 2009, she was voted as one of India's most popular icons. She attended the 83rd Academy Awards, along with her husband, Abhishek. Rai with her husband Abhishek Bachchan appeared on The Oprah Winfrey Show on 28 September 2009. She is the first Indian celebrity who appeared in The Oprah Winfrey Show twice. They have been described as a supercouple in the Indian media.

She ranked 2nd in The Times of Indias 50 most desirable women of 2010, and ranked 9th for 2011. In 2011, she has received a lot of negative publicity for failing to lose her post-pregnancy weight as is apparently "required" of a public figure. However, she silenced her critics by walking the red carpet at the "AmfAR Cinema Against Aids" gala in 2012 Cannes Film Festival for the 11th time. Later that year, Rai has made it to the issue of New York Magazines list of "Forty Women That Women Find Beautiful", where she grabbed the 21st position in the list, with New York Magazine saying "She may be the "world's most beautiful woman," but what we really love is that she never feels fragile onscreen". The market research firm YouGov named Rai the world's eleventh most admired person of 2018.

Endorsements 

Rai made her first commercial for Camlin exam pencils when she was in the 9th grade. Rai became popular after appearing in a Pepsi commercial with actor Aamir Khan. She is the only actress who endorsed both Pepsi and Coca-Cola. She is one of the top brand ambassadors in the country and is one of the top paid Bollywood actresses in this respect. She modelled for Titan Watches, Longines watches, L'Oréal, Coca-Cola, Lakmé Cosmetics, Casio pager, Philips, Palmolive, Lux, Fuji films, Nakshatra Diamond Jewellery, and Kalyan Jewellers. She was named the official brand ambassador for De Beers diamonds in India. Rai has been ranked the 2nd most popular watch brand ambassador worldwide in a survey, conducted by World Watch Report. In 2013 Rai and her husband Abhishek Bachchan have been roped in as the brand ambassadors by the TTK Group.

Works and accolades 

Rai has appeared in over 47 films in five languages, predominantly in Hindi and Tamil. She has received several accolades, which include two Filmfare Awards for her roles in Hum Dil De Chuke Sanam (1999) and Devdas (2002).

References

Further reading

External links 

 
 
 

1973 births
Living people
Femina Miss India winners
Indian beauty pageant winners
Indian film actresses
Indian Hindus
Miss World 1994 delegates
Miss World winners
Officiers of the Ordre des Arts et des Lettres
Tulu people
Recipients of the Padma Shri in arts
Jai Hind College alumni
Actresses from Mumbai
Actresses in Hindi cinema
Actresses in Tamil cinema
Actresses in Bengali cinema
Actresses in Telugu cinema
20th-century Indian actresses
21st-century Indian actresses
Zee Cine Awards winners
Actresses from Mangalore
Indian expatriate actresses in the United States
Indian expatriate actresses in the United Kingdom
Kalarippayattu practitioners
Indian female martial artists
Female models from Karnataka
Bachchan family
Filmfare Awards winners
Screen Awards winners
International Indian Film Academy Awards winners
Panama Papers